WGDV-LD (channel 32) is a low-power television station in Salisbury, Maryland, United States, affiliated with MeTV. It is owned by locally based Marquee Broadcasting alongside ABC affiliate and company flagship WMDT (channel 47). Both stations share studios on West Main Street (mailing address is Downtown Plaza) in Salisbury, while WGDV-LD's transmitter is located in rural Wicomico County northeast of Mardela Springs.

WGDV was affiliated with the Spanish-language Azteca América network until its closure on December 31, 2022.

Subchannels
The station's digital signal is multiplexed:

References 

 
 

GDV-LD
Television channels and stations established in 2016
2016 establishments in Maryland
MeTV affiliates
Bounce TV affiliates
Heroes & Icons affiliates
Ion Mystery affiliates
Laff (TV network) affiliates
Grit (TV network) affiliates
Court TV affiliates
Marquee Broadcasting
Low-power television stations in the United States